Watkinsville is the largest town and county seat of Oconee County, Georgia, United States. As of the 2020 census, the town had a total population of 2,896. It served as the seat of Clarke County until 1872 when the county seat of that county was moved to Athens, a move which ultimately led to the creation of Oconee County in 1875. It is included in the Athens-Clarke County, Georgia Metropolitan Statistical Area.

Geography 

Watkinsville is located at  (33.862818, -83.408094).

Watkinsville is located near the University of Georgia.

Transportation

Major roads 

  State Route 15
  State Route 24
  State Route 53
  U.S. Route 129
  U.S. Route 441

Pedestrians and cycling 
The city has limited walkability options available. However, since 2017 plans are being discussed to develop a multi-use trail network. A new sidewalk on VFW Drive (and a few surrounding streets) and a planned sidewalk and pedestrian bridge along Harden Hill Road have changed that perception greatly. Phase I of the construction of the Harden Hill sidewalk was recently contracted and has begun to be finished by Christmas 2019.

Demographics

2020 census

As of the 2020 United States census, there were 2,896 people, 1,042 households, and 741 families residing in the city.

2000 census
As of the census of 2000, there were 2,097 people, 827 households, and 578 families residing in the town. The racial makeup of the town was 89.08% White, 7.34% African American, 0.05% Native American, 1.62% Asian, 0.48% Pacific Islander, 0.86% from other races, and 0.57% from two or more races. Hispanic or Latino of any race were 1.96% of the population.

There were 827 households, out of which 36.5% had children under the age of 18 living with them, 53.6% were married couples living together, 12.7% had a female householder with no husband present, and 30.1% were non-families. 24.4% of all households were made up of individuals, and 8.5% had someone living alone who was 65 years of age or older. The average household size was 2.51 and the average family size was 2.99.

In the town, the population was spread out, with 26.8% under the age of 18, 8.6% from 18 to 24, 33.0% from 25 to 44, 22.7% from 45 to 64, and 8.9% who were 65 years of age or older. The median age was 34 years. For every 100 females, there were 92.7 males. For every 100 females age 18 and over, there were 91.5 males.

The median income for a household in the town was $45,729, and the median income for a family was $55,170. Males had a median income of $32,295 versus $26,168 for females. The per capita income for the town was $20,968. About 3.8% of families and 5.0% of the population were below the poverty line, including 5.9% of those under age 18 and 4.7% of those age 65 or over.

History 
Named after colonel Robert Watkins, Watkinsville was first named in records in 1791. It was located on the dangerous western frontier of the new United States. The Methodist Church played a prominent role in the city’s early history. The Georgia General Assembly incorporated Watkinsville in 1815.

Watkinsville had previously been in Clarke County. Oconee County was created from the southwestern part of Clarke County in 1875 by the Georgia General Assembly.

1905 lynching 

On 30 June 1905, Watkinsville saw one of the worse outbreaks of racial violence ever in Georgia. In one instance, 8 men, 7 of whom were black, were pulled from a local jail and lynched. The lynching occurred due to two events. One of which was accusations that Sandy Price, one of the black males, assaulted a white woman named Weldon Dooley at her home in Watkinsville. Secondly, unsupported rumors spread that black males had killed a white couple known as the Holbrooks. This provoked the town people further. Price tried to flee from a crowd of angry locals, who chased and fired at him. He escaped the crowd of people, but was captured by the law and placed in jail. News of Price’s jailing reached the people and they begun planning his killing. People from the surrounding areas gathered together and forcefully retrieved the key to the jail cells from L. H. Alken, the marshal of the local jail. According to two eyewitnesses, the mob tied the African Americans and one white man to posts outside the jail after retrieving them, then shot them multiple times with pistols, rifles, and shotguns. The only survivor of the killings was Joe Patterson, who was shot in the head and torso, but found still breathing by the crowd. One black male inside the jail, Ed Thrasher, was spared from the lynching. Another incident occurred on 1917 that could have been racially motivated.

Government 

Watkinsville is governed by a five-person elected city council, which is led by a separately elected mayor. The current mayor is Brian Brodrick, and the current city council members are Chuck Garrett, Connie Massey, Brett Thomas, Christine Tucker, and Jeff Campbell. The city clerk is Julie Sanders. The City Manager is Sharyn Dickerson, formerly an Athens-Clarke Commissioner.

Education 

The Oconee County School District provides primary and secondary public education services for all residents of Watkinsville.  The only public school within the Watkinsville city limits is Colham Ferry Elementary School.
Watkinsville has one of the best education systems in Georgia as ranked by the Georgia Department of Education. There are also several private schools such as Westminster Christian Academy, Athens Academy, and Prince Avenue Christian School.

Arts and culture

Watkinsville has the unofficial motto "The Artland of Georgia" on the wall of the Community Center, as designed by the late artist Jim Shearon. The Oconee Cultural Arts Foundation or OCAF is located in Watkinsville in the old high school as part of the 1902 OCAF Center and Gallery near the Board of Education. The Iron Horse sculpture stands in a field approximately twelve miles south of Watkinsville (barely in Greene County).

Notable people
Nathan Crawford Barnett, member of the Georgia House of Representatives and Georgia Secretary of State
Alan Busenitz, baseball player
Ed Crowley, baseball player
Atticus Haygood, Methodist Bishop and Emory College president
Hank Huckaby, chancellor of University System of Georgia
Zach Mettenberger, NFL quarterback for Tennessee Titans
Jeannette Rankin, first woman to serve in Congress
Tony Taylor, pro football player
Buck Thrasher, baseball player
John Wes Townley, retired NASCAR driver, notable for driving Zaxby's car
Marcus Wiedower, Politician. Member of Georgia House of Representatives.

References

External links 
 Watkinsville Official Website
 Watkinsville Web Page at georgia.gov

Towns in Oconee County, Georgia
Towns in Georgia (U.S. state)
County seats in Georgia (U.S. state)
Athens – Clarke County metropolitan area
Former county seats in Georgia (U.S. state)